Remembering Patsy Cline is a tribute album to Patsy Cline. It was released on September 9, 2003 by MCA Records. The album peaked at number 1 on the Billboard Top Jazz Albums chart, number 8 on the Billboard Top Country Albums chart and number 71 on the all-genre Billboard 200.

Track listing

Chart performance

References

2003 albums
Country albums by American artists
MCA Records albums